Mohamed Alí Seineldín (Arabic:  محمد علي زين الدين ) (November 12, 1933 – September 2, 2009) was an Argentine army colonel who participated in two failed uprisings against the democratically elected governments of both President Raúl Alfonsín and President Carlos Menem in 1988 and 1990.

Early life 
Seineldín was born in Concepción del Uruguay into a Lebanese Argentine family. He converted from Druzism to Roman Catholicism during his youth, and was consecrated to the Virgin of the Rosary (Virgen del Rosario). He remained a devout Roman Catholic throughout his life, even devoting his men in the army to the Virgin of the Holy Rosary as well. In an interview on his goals during his military career, Seineldín later explained, Luchamos por el mismo objetivo, que es la nacionalidad y la fe cristiana, which translates as, "We fought for the same goal, which is nationality and the Christian faith."

Falkland War
Seineldín rose to prominence in Argentina during the 1982 Falklands War against the United Kingdom, where he was in command of the 25th Infantry Regiment, part of the garrison occupying Port Stanley .

"Carapintada" activity 
An ardent Christian Argentine nationalist, Seineldín became a member of the Carapintadas, or "painted faces," group within the Argentine Army. The Carapintadas demanded that the Argentine government halt legal proceedings against army officers accused of human rights abuses during the Dirty War, which occurred during Argentina's military dictatorship from 1976 to 1983. The low-ranking officers were charged with a wide range of crimes, including the execution of guerrilla dissidents, torture and kidnapping of guerrilla fighters and their supporters.

In 1987 and 1988, the Carapintadas rebelled against the elected government of President Raúl Alfonsín, but both uprisings were quickly put down. In December 1988, members of the Grupo Albatros, led by Colonel Mohamed Alí Seineldín rebelled once again against the Alfonsín government and seized the military barracks at Villa Martelli. The mutineers eventually surrendered and Seineldín was arrested.

Seineldín led a second unsuccessful uprising against the government of President Carlos Menem beginning on December 3, 1990. The failed uprising resulted in 14 deaths, including five civilians. Seineldín was sentenced to life in prison for his role in the 1990 mutiny. However, he was pardoned by President Eduardo Duhalde in 2003. During his trial, he assumed full guilt and denounced how Menem's government was servile to the United States' imperialism in Latin America through the privatizations of strategic services and the suspension of scientific and military projects.

Death 
Mohamed Alí Seineldín suffered a heart attack and died in a hospital in Buenos Aires on September 2, 2009, at the age of 75.

References

External links
Mohamed Alí Seineldín, ex militar golpista 
Coronel Seineldín-La defensa nacional 

1933 births
2009 deaths
Argentine Army officers
Argentine military personnel of the Falklands War
Argentine nationalists
Argentine people of Lebanese descent
Argentine Druze
Argentine anti-communists
Argentine Roman Catholics
Converts to Roman Catholicism from Druzism
People from Buenos Aires
People from Uruguay Department
Recipients of Argentine presidential pardons
Carapintadas